Weber is a hamlet situated 28 km south-east of Dannevirke and 23 km WNW of Herbertville, on the east coast of New Zealand. Weber was named after the German born surveyor Charles H. Weber (*1830) who died during a surveying project near Woodville in 1886. His body was only found three years after his disappearance.

Weber is just off the former State Highway 52. This is a scenic tourist route between Waipukurau and Eketahuna which also runs past the place with the world's longest place name, Taumatawhakatangihangakoauauotamateapokaiwhenuakitanatahu. A short distance from Weber are the Waihi Falls.
Weber had a cemetery, located approximately 2 km to the west of the settlement.  It contains around 51 burial plots with just under half of those being aged 13 or under.  A recent, (2013), memorial to those buried there has been erected alongside the main road into Weber.

Weber is the exact antipode for the Spanish capital Madrid.

History

The hamlet was founded the late 19th century as an overnight stop for coach teams on the journey to and from the coast. This was the distance a team of 6 horses and a coach could travel in one day.

At the turn of the century it was a thriving small community.  It had a police station and one cell jail, a large hotel, shops and a post office.  Today it consists of a church, a school, a pub, a rural fire depot, a community centre and several houses.

Wises index of every place in NZ  (1897) describes Weber as, WEBER, Hawke's Bay. On Akitio River; in Waipawa County; 104 m south from Napier. Rail to Dannevirke, thence coach Monday, Wednesday, and Friday, 25 m (10s). Daily service in summer. Grazing and sawmilling. Good shooting, game of all kinds in season. Cycle roads fair only; the Akitio River falls reached on horseback, great attraction. One hotel; private board 25s. Post and telegraph office, called after the first surveyor of the township. Resident doctor. Is the name of a county.  A recent (2013) memorial to the Weber cemetery was erected alongside a paper road some 2 km west of the settlement.

In 1990, Weber was the epicentre for a large earthquake.  The local geology of the area magnified the effect making the earthquake seem worse than it was. It is known locally as the "Mother's Day earthquake" as it occurred during Mother's Day.

During the two world wars the local population of Weber lost a great number of its men. Weber has a permanent war memorial.  The first ANZAC parade in 50 years took place in 2010.

Education

References

Tararua District
Populated places in Manawatū-Whanganui